The 1970 VFL season was the 74th season of the Victorian Football League (VFL), the highest level senior Australian rules football competition in Victoria.

The season featured twelve clubs, and ran from 4 April until 26 September. It was the first season to play comprise a 22-game home-and-away season, which became the standard for the following fifty years, and which was followed by a finals series featuring the top four clubs. The season saw the opening of the league's privately owned stadium, VFL Park, in Mulgrave.

The premiership was won by the Carlton Football Club for the tenth time, after it defeated  by ten points in the 1970 VFL Grand Final. A crowd of 121,696 attended the match, the all-time record for the highest Australian rules football crowd.

Premiership season
In 1970, the VFL competition consisted of twelve teams of 18 on-the-field players each, plus two substitute players, known as the 19th man and the 20th man. A player could be substituted for any reason; however, once substituted, a player could not return to the field of play under any circumstances.

Teams played each other in a home-and-away season of 22 rounds; matches 12 to 22 were the "home-and-way reverse" of matches 1 to 11.

Once the 22 round home-and-away season had finished, the 1970 VFL Premiers were determined by the specific format and conventions of the Page–McIntyre system.

Round 1

|- bgcolor="#CCCCFF"
| Home team
| Home team score
| Away team
| Away team score
| Venue
| Crowd
| Date
|- bgcolor="#FFFFFF"
| 
| 21.19 (145)
| 
| 14.12 (96)
| Princes Park
| 23,948
| 4 April 1970
|- bgcolor="#FFFFFF"
| 
| 14.16 (100)
| 
| 7.6 (48)
| Moorabbin Oval
| 21,429
| 4 April 1970
|- bgcolor="#FFFFFF"
| 
| 9.14 (68)
| 
| 14.9 (93)
| Lake Oval
| 15,242
| 4 April 1970
|- bgcolor="#FFFFFF"
| 
| 19.12 (126)
| 
| 21.9 (135)
| Glenferrie Oval
| 20,509
| 4 April 1970
|- bgcolor="#FFFFFF"
| 
| 12.12 (84)
| 
| 23.10 (148)
| Western Oval
| 26,596
| 4 April 1970
|- bgcolor="#FFFFFF"
| 
| 14.12 (96)
| 
| 16.20 (116)
| MCG
| 38,617
| 5 April 1970

Round 2

|- bgcolor="#CCCCFF"
| Home team
| Home team score
| Away team
| Away team score
| Venue
| Crowd
| Date
|- bgcolor="#FFFFFF"
| 
| 8.11 (59)
| 
| 8.12 (60)
| Arden Street Oval
| 10,986
| 11 April 1970
|- bgcolor="#FFFFFF"
| 
| 7.9 (51)
| 
| 23.23 (161)
| Junction Oval
| 22,857
| 11 April 1970
|- bgcolor="#FFFFFF"
| 
| 10.14 (74)
| 
| 14.22 (106)
| Windy Hill
| 19,380
| 11 April 1970
|- bgcolor="#FFFFFF"
| 
| 19.19 (133)
| 
| 13.16 (94)
| Victoria Park
| 35,318
| 11 April 1970
|- bgcolor="#FFFFFF"
| 
| 14.12 (96)
| 
| 11.19 (85)
| MCG
| 25,575
| 11 April 1970
|- bgcolor="#FFFFFF"
| 
| 12.9 (81)
| 
| 16.7 (103)
| Kardinia Park
| 28,302
| 11 April 1970

Round 3

|- bgcolor="#CCCCFF"
| Home team
| Home team score
| Away team
| Away team score
| Venue
| Crowd
| Date
|- bgcolor="#FFFFFF"
| 
| 14.23 (107)
| 
| 10.14 (74)
| Western Oval
| 17,972
| 18 April 1970
|- bgcolor="#FFFFFF"
| 
| 14.24 (108)
| 
| 15.11 (101)
| Victoria Park
| 24,532
| 18 April 1970
|- bgcolor="#FFFFFF"
| 
| 18.13 (121)
| 
| 8.16 (64)
| Arden Street Oval
| 10,182
| 18 April 1970
|- bgcolor="#FFFFFF"
| 
| 12.17 (89)
| 
| 15.10 (100)
| Lake Oval
| 14,726
| 18 April 1970
|- bgcolor="#FFFFFF"
| 
| 17.12 (114)
| 
| 15.11 (101)
| MCG
| 46,373
| 18 April 1970
|- bgcolor="#FFFFFF"
| 
| 7.11 (53)
| 
| 17.12 (114)
| VFL Park
| 27,557
| 18 April 1970

Round 4

|- bgcolor="#CCCCFF"
| Home team
| Home team score
| Away team
| Away team score
| Venue
| Crowd
| Date
|- bgcolor="#FFFFFF"
| 
| 16.16 (112)
| 
| 13.15 (93)
| Princes Park
| 20,540
| 25 April 1970
|- bgcolor="#FFFFFF"
| 
| 15.19 (109)
| 
| 7.12 (54)
| Moorabbin Oval
| 32,147
| 25 April 1970
|- bgcolor="#FFFFFF"
| 
| 17.19 (121)
| 
| 13.13 (91)
| MCG
| 22,909
| 25 April 1970
|- bgcolor="#FFFFFF"
| 
| 10.10 (70)
| 
| 16.14 (110)
| Glenferrie Oval
| 19,017
| 25 April 1970
|- bgcolor="#FFFFFF"
| 
| 14.9 (93)
| 
| 14.17 (101)
| Kardinia Park
| 35,654
| 25 April 1970
|- bgcolor="#FFFFFF"
| 
| 11.11 (77)
| 
| 9.6 (60)
| VFL Park
| 24,371
| 25 April 1970

Round 5

|- bgcolor="#CCCCFF"
| Home team
| Home team score
| Away team
| Away team score
| Venue
| Crowd
| Date
|- bgcolor="#FFFFFF"
| 
| 6.13 (49)
| 
| 10.11 (71)
| MCG
| 23,084
| 2 May 1970
|- bgcolor="#FFFFFF"
| 
| 11.13 (79)
| 
| 11.10 (76)
| Western Oval
| 19,610
| 2 May 1970
|- bgcolor="#FFFFFF"
| 
| 5.24 (54)
| 
| 7.7 (49)
| Junction Oval
| 7,450
| 2 May 1970
|- bgcolor="#FFFFFF"
| 
| 9.14 (68)
| 
| 14.4 (88)
| Windy Hill
| 16,077
| 2 May 1970
|- bgcolor="#FFFFFF"
| 
| 8.9 (57)
| 
| 12.14 (86)
| Moorabbin Oval
| 22,800
| 2 May 1970
|- bgcolor="#FFFFFF"
| 
| 8.17 (65)
| 
| 8.9 (57)
| VFL Park
| 28,454
| 2 May 1970

Round 6

|- bgcolor="#CCCCFF"
| Home team
| Home team score
| Away team
| Away team score
| Venue
| Crowd
| Date
|- bgcolor="#FFFFFF"
| 
| 23.9 (147)
| 
| 15.20 (110)
| Princes Park
| 20,022
| 9 May 1970
|- bgcolor="#FFFFFF"
| 
| 9.25 (79)
| 
| 9.8 (62)
| Lake Oval
| 20,312
| 9 May 1970
|- bgcolor="#FFFFFF"
| 
| 18.15 (123)
| 
| 11.11 (77)
| Kardinia Park
| 21,139
| 9 May 1970
|- bgcolor="#FFFFFF"
| 
| 10.12 (72)
| 
| 7.15 (57)
| MCG
| 34,219
| 9 May 1970
|- bgcolor="#FFFFFF"
| 
| 10.6 (66)
| 
| 17.30 (132)
| Arden Street Oval
| 20,091
| 9 May 1970
|- bgcolor="#FFFFFF"
| 
| 20.10 (130)
| 
| 21.11 (137)
| VFL Park
| 26,133
| 9 May 1970

Round 7

|- bgcolor="#CCCCFF"
| Home team
| Home team score
| Away team
| Away team score
| Venue
| Crowd
| Date
|- bgcolor="#FFFFFF"
| 
| 9.14 (68)
| 
| 7.4 (46)
| Western Oval
| 16,346
| 16 May 1970
|- bgcolor="#FFFFFF"
| 
| 15.15 (105)
| 
| 9.18 (72)
| Victoria Park
| 22,774
| 16 May 1970
|- bgcolor="#FFFFFF"
| 
| 10.21 (81)
| 
| 8.8 (56)
| Moorabbin Oval
| 17,618
| 16 May 1970
|- bgcolor="#FFFFFF"
| 
| 16.20 (116)
| 
| 15.2 (92)
| MCG
| 43,435
| 16 May 1970
|- bgcolor="#FFFFFF"
| 
| 23.12 (150)
| 
| 10.13 (73)
| Lake Oval
| 28,395
| 16 May 1970
|- bgcolor="#FFFFFF"
| 
| 8.12 (60)
| 
| 9.22 (76)
| VFL Park
| 13,339
| 16 May 1970

Round 8

|- bgcolor="#CCCCFF"
| Home team
| Home team score
| Away team
| Away team score
| Venue
| Crowd
| Date
|- bgcolor="#FFFFFF"
| 
| 15.10 (100)
| 
| 18.19 (127)
| MCG
| 36,064
| 23 May 1970
|- bgcolor="#FFFFFF"
| 
| 21.20 (146)
| 
| 12.12 (84)
| Glenferrie Oval
| 17,063
| 23 May 1970
|- bgcolor="#FFFFFF"
| 
| 14.5 (89)
| 
| 12.9 (81)
| Kardinia Park
| 20,942
| 23 May 1970
|- bgcolor="#FFFFFF"
| 
| 9.13 (67)
| 
| 13.18 (96)
| Arden Street Oval
| 13,475
| 23 May 1970
|- bgcolor="#FFFFFF"
| 
| 9.14 (68)
| 
| 11.5 (71)
| Junction Oval
| 12,264
| 23 May 1970
|- bgcolor="#FFFFFF"
| 
| 12.13 (85)
| 
| 16.12 (108)
| VFL Park
| 55,332
| 23 May 1970

Round 9

|- bgcolor="#CCCCFF"
| Home team
| Home team score
| Away team
| Away team score
| Venue
| Crowd
| Date
|- bgcolor="#FFFFFF"
| 
| 10.14 (74)
| 
| 15.16 (106)
| Princes Park
| 19,298
| 30 May 1970
|- bgcolor="#FFFFFF"
| 
| 10.17 (77)
| 
| 15.7 (97)
| MCG
| 22,284
| 30 May 1970
|- bgcolor="#FFFFFF"
| 
| 14.12 (96)
| 
| 7.11 (53)
| Moorabbin Oval
| 19,393
| 30 May 1970
|- bgcolor="#FFFFFF"
| 
| 19.14 (128)
| 
| 10.18 (78)
| Lake Oval
| 19,794
| 30 May 1970
|- bgcolor="#FFFFFF"
| 
| 13.15 (93)
| 
| 11.21 (87)
| Windy Hill
| 24,936
| 30 May 1970
|- bgcolor="#FFFFFF"
| 
| 11.13 (79)
| 
| 12.9 (81)
| VFL Park
| 10,292
| 30 May 1970

Round 10

|- bgcolor="#CCCCFF"
| Home team
| Home team score
| Away team
| Away team score
| Venue
| Crowd
| Date
|- bgcolor="#FFFFFF"
| 
| 14.9 (93)
| 
| 12.19 (91)
| Junction Oval
| 16,971
| 6 June 1970
|- bgcolor="#FFFFFF"
| 
| 14.13 (97)
| 
| 15.14 (104)
| Windy Hill
| 20,650
| 6 June 1970
|- bgcolor="#FFFFFF"
| 
| 14.23 (107)
| 
| 15.10 (100)
| Victoria Park
| 30,858
| 6 June 1970
|- bgcolor="#FFFFFF"
| 
| 10.14 (74)
| 
| 13.13 (91)
| MCG
| 27,665
| 6 June 1970
|- bgcolor="#FFFFFF"
| 
| 15.14 (104)
| 
| 14.10 (94)
| Western Oval
| 22,262
| 6 June 1970
|- bgcolor="#FFFFFF"
| 
| 9.8 (62)
| 
| 11.9 (75)
| VFL Park
| 14,214
| 6 June 1970

Round 11

|- bgcolor="#CCCCFF"
| Home team
| Home team score
| Away team
| Away team score
| Venue
| Crowd
| Date
|- bgcolor="#FFFFFF"
| 
| 11.17 (83)
| 
| 9.10 (64)
| Kardinia Park
| 19,133
| 15 June 1970
|- bgcolor="#FFFFFF"
| 
| 22.15 (147)
| 
| 9.8 (62)
| Princes Park
| 18,760
| 15 June 1970
|- bgcolor="#FFFFFF"
| 
| 22.15 (147)
| 
| 13.12 (90)
| MCG
| 41,866
| 15 June 1970
|- bgcolor="#FFFFFF"
| 
| 18.12 (120)
| 
| 12.8 (80)
| Glenferrie Oval
| 14,489
| 15 June 1970
|- bgcolor="#FFFFFF"
| 
| 16.15 (111)
| 
| 16.14 (110)
| Lake Oval
| 35,567
| 15 June 1970
|- bgcolor="#FFFFFF"
| 
| 8.21 (69)
| 
| 8.9 (57)
| VFL Park
| 21,105
| 15 June 1970

Round 12

|- bgcolor="#CCCCFF"
| Home team
| Home team score
| Away team
| Away team score
| Venue
| Crowd
| Date
|- bgcolor="#FFFFFF"
| 
| 5.10 (40)
| 
| 11.5 (71)
| Arden Street Oval
| 10,007
| 20 June 1970
|- bgcolor="#FFFFFF"
| 
| 14.15 (99)
| 
| 10.11 (71)
| Kardinia Park
| 12,698
| 20 June 1970
|- bgcolor="#FFFFFF"
| 
| 12.11 (83)
| 
| 8.9 (57)
| Junction Oval
| 14,541
| 20 June 1970
|- bgcolor="#FFFFFF"
| 
| 8.16 (64)
| 
| 7.9 (51)
| Victoria Park
| 23,008
| 20 June 1970
|- bgcolor="#FFFFFF"
| 
| 10.16 (76)
| 
| 12.9 (81)
| Windy Hill
| 20,270
| 20 June 1970
|- bgcolor="#FFFFFF"
| 
| 12.6 (78)
| 
| 12.10 (82)
| VFL Park
| 13,962
| 20 June 1970

Round 13

|- bgcolor="#CCCCFF"
| Home team
| Home team score
| Away team
| Away team score
| Venue
| Crowd
| Date
|- bgcolor="#FFFFFF"
| 
| 16.17 (113)
| 
| 11.8 (74)
| Glenferrie Oval
| 13,196
| 27 June 1970
|- bgcolor="#FFFFFF"
| 
| 12.21 (93)
| 
| 11.14 (80)
| Princes Park
| 25,519
| 27 June 1970
|- bgcolor="#FFFFFF"
| 
| 16.9 (105)
| 
| 14.12 (96)
| Lake Oval
| 12,407
| 27 June 1970
|- bgcolor="#FFFFFF"
| 
| 11.14 (80)
| 
| 8.11 (59)
| Moorabbin Oval
| 17,073
| 27 June 1970
|- bgcolor="#FFFFFF"
| 
| 11.12 (78)
| 
| 9.8 (62)
| Western Oval
| 18,817
| 27 June 1970
|- bgcolor="#FFFFFF"
| 
| 11.13 (79)
| 
| 9.13 (67)
| VFL Park
| 23,939
| 27 June 1970

Round 14

|- bgcolor="#CCCCFF"
| Home team
| Home team score
| Away team
| Away team score
| Venue
| Crowd
| Date
|- bgcolor="#FFFFFF"
| 
| 11.19 (85)
| 
| 11.11 (77)
| MCG
| 13,975
| 4 July 1970
|- bgcolor="#FFFFFF"
| 
| 11.12 (78)
| 
| 7.7 (49)
| Princes Park
| 26,895
| 4 July 1970
|- bgcolor="#FFFFFF"
| 
| 6.16 (52)
| 
| 6.10 (46)
| Moorabbin Oval
| 15,415
| 4 July 1970
|- bgcolor="#FFFFFF"
| 
| 20.8 (128)
| 
| 13.16 (94)
| Kardinia Park
| 15,304
| 4 July 1970
|- bgcolor="#FFFFFF"
| 
| 18.7 (115)
| 
| 13.13 (91)
| Glenferrie Oval
| 19,587
| 4 July 1970
|- bgcolor="#FFFFFF"
| 
| 5.10 (40)
| 
| 11.5 (71)
| VFL Park
| 13,238
| 4 July 1970

Round 15

|- bgcolor="#CCCCFF"
| Home team
| Home team score
| Away team
| Away team score
| Venue
| Crowd
| Date
|- bgcolor="#FFFFFF"
| 
| 11.15 (81)
| 
| 7.21 (63)
| MCG
| 38,037
| 11 July 1970
|- bgcolor="#FFFFFF"
| 
| 6.4 (40)
| 
| 13.10 (88)
| Western Oval
| 21,921
| 11 July 1970
|- bgcolor="#FFFFFF"
| 
| 12.18 (90)
| 
| 8.14 (62)
| Junction Oval
| 9,467
| 11 July 1970
|- bgcolor="#FFFFFF"
| 
| 9.8 (62)
| 
| 21.4 (130)
| Windy Hill
| 13,174
| 11 July 1970
|- bgcolor="#FFFFFF"
| 
| 13.15 (93)
| 
| 8.16 (64)
| Victoria Park
| 28,847
| 11 July 1970
|- bgcolor="#FFFFFF"
| 
| 4.7 (31)
| 
| 13.21 (99)
| VFL Park
| 12,572
| 11 July 1970

Round 16

|- bgcolor="#CCCCFF"
| Home team
| Home team score
| Away team
| Away team score
| Venue
| Crowd
| Date
|- bgcolor="#FFFFFF"
| 
| 16.14 (110)
| 
| 10.11 (71)
| Princes Park
| 22,988
| 18 July 1970
|- bgcolor="#FFFFFF"
| 
| 11.9 (75)
| 
| 12.17 (89)
| Lake Oval
| 25,651
| 18 July 1970
|- bgcolor="#FFFFFF"
| 
| 13.17 (95)
| 
| 18.14 (122)
| Arden Street Oval
| 8,443
| 18 July 1970
|- bgcolor="#FFFFFF"
| 
| 15.16 (106)
| 
| 8.17 (65)
| Kardinia Park
| 17,220
| 18 July 1970
|- bgcolor="#FFFFFF"
| 
| 7.19 (61)
| 
| 10.16 (76)
| MCG
| 36,044
| 18 July 1970
|- bgcolor="#FFFFFF"
| 
| 23.9 (147)
| 
| 6.12 (48)
| VFL Park
| 14,151
| 18 July 1970

Round 17

|- bgcolor="#CCCCFF"
| Home team
| Home team score
| Away team
| Away team score
| Venue
| Crowd
| Date
|- bgcolor="#FFFFFF"
| 
| 13.14 (92)
| 
| 11.6 (72)
| Moorabbin Oval
| 20,851
| 25 July 1970
|- bgcolor="#FFFFFF"
| 
| 12.15 (87)
| 
| 7.14 (56)
| Western Oval
| 14,660
| 25 July 1970
|- bgcolor="#FFFFFF"
| 
| 18.17 (125)
| 
| 12.17 (89)
| Windy Hill
| 9,755
| 25 July 1970
|- bgcolor="#FFFFFF"
| 
| 14.21 (105)
| 
| 8.8 (56)
| Victoria Park
| 15,678
| 25 July 1970
|- bgcolor="#FFFFFF"
| 
| 15.15 (105)
| 
| 11.17 (83)
| MCG
| 55,740
| 25 July 1970
|- bgcolor="#FFFFFF"
| 
| 9.7 (61)
| 
| 10.11 (71)
| VFL Park
| 13,828
| 25 July 1970

Round 18

|- bgcolor="#CCCCFF"
| Home team
| Home team score
| Away team
| Away team score
| Venue
| Crowd
| Date
|- bgcolor="#FFFFFF"
| 
| 11.11 (77)
| 
| 14.18 (102)
| Glenferrie Oval
| 16,698
| 1 August 1970
|- bgcolor="#FFFFFF"
| 
| 11.17 (83)
| 
| 10.19 (79)
| Princes Park
| 27,271
| 1 August 1970
|- bgcolor="#FFFFFF"
| 
| 8.13 (61)
| 
| 10.15 (75)
| MCG
| 16,591
| 1 August 1970
|- bgcolor="#FFFFFF"
| 
| 13.13 (91)
| 
| 16.22 (118)
| Arden Street Oval
| 8,952
| 1 August 1970
|- bgcolor="#FFFFFF"
| 
| 11.9 (75)
| 
| 17.15 (117)
| Junction Oval
| 18,760
| 1 August 1970
|- bgcolor="#FFFFFF"
| 
| 13.10 (88)
| 
| 8.13 (61)
| VFL Park
| 26,378
| 1 August 1970

Round 19

|- bgcolor="#CCCCFF"
| Home team
| Home team score
| Away team
| Away team score
| Venue
| Crowd
| Date
|- bgcolor="#FFFFFF"
| 
| 10.23 (83)
| 
| 11.15 (81)
| Western Oval
| 13,118
| 8 August 1970
|- bgcolor="#FFFFFF"
| 
| 12.16 (88)
| 
| 14.10 (94)
| Windy Hill
| 13,572
| 8 August 1970
|- bgcolor="#FFFFFF"
| 
| 9.10 (64)
| 
| 18.10 (118)
| MCG
| 25,158
| 8 August 1970
|- bgcolor="#FFFFFF"
| 
| 16.7 (103)
| 
| 13.8 (86)
| Lake Oval
| 17,437
| 8 August 1970
|- bgcolor="#FFFFFF"
| 
| 13.23 (101)
| 
| 2.12 (24)
| Victoria Park
| 39,959
| 8 August 1970
|- bgcolor="#FFFFFF"
| 
| 12.16 (88)
| 
| 5.7 (37)
| VFL Park
| 29,667
| 8 August 1970

Round 20

|- bgcolor="#CCCCFF"
| Home team
| Home team score
| Away team
| Away team score
| Venue
| Crowd
| Date
|- bgcolor="#FFFFFF"
| 
| 7.6 (48)
| 
| 16.10 (106)
| Arden Street Oval
| 8,837
| 15 August 1970
|- bgcolor="#FFFFFF"
| 
| 10.14 (74)
| 
| 11.15 (81)
| Kardinia Park
| 29,918
| 15 August 1970
|- bgcolor="#FFFFFF"
| 
| 12.10 (82)
| 
| 11.14 (80)
| Junction Oval
| 11,398
| 15 August 1970
|- bgcolor="#FFFFFF"
| 
| 24.16 (160)
| 
| 11.13 (79)
| Victoria Park
| 24,785
| 15 August 1970
|- bgcolor="#FFFFFF"
| 
| 13.9 (87)
| 
| 18.9 (117)
| Glenferrie Oval
| 20,841
| 15 August 1970
|- bgcolor="#FFFFFF"
| 
| 7.14 (56)
| 
| 17.14 (116)
| VFL Park
| 22,570
| 15 August 1970

Round 21

|- bgcolor="#CCCCFF"
| Home team
| Home team score
| Away team
| Away team score
| Venue
| Crowd
| Date
|- bgcolor="#FFFFFF"
| 
| 21.14 (140)
| 
| 9.20 (74)
| Glenferrie Oval
| 8,061
| 22 August 1970
|- bgcolor="#FFFFFF"
| 
| 16.12 (108)
| 
| 13.18 (96)
| Kardinia Park
| 13,670
| 22 August 1970
|- bgcolor="#FFFFFF"
| 
| 18.14 (122)
| 
| 17.6 (108)
| Princes Park
| 21,568
| 22 August 1970
|- bgcolor="#FFFFFF"
| 
| 14.15 (99)
| 
| 10.20 (80)
| Lake Oval
| 20,071
| 22 August 1970
|- bgcolor="#FFFFFF"
| 
| 23.13 (151)
| 
| 11.11 (77)
| MCG
| 25,862
| 22 August 1970
|- bgcolor="#FFFFFF"
| 
| 14.14 (98)
| 
| 16.12 (108)
| Moorabbin Oval
| 38,222
| 22 August 1970

Round 22

|- bgcolor="#CCCCFF"
| Home team
| Home team score
| Away team
| Away team score
| Venue
| Crowd
| Date
|- bgcolor="#FFFFFF"
| 
| 12.10 (82)
| 
| 10.12 (72)
| Western Oval
| 16,672
| 29 August 1970
|- bgcolor="#FFFFFF"
| 
| 9.11 (65)
| 
| 18.16 (124)
| Junction Oval
| 11,626
| 29 August 1970
|- bgcolor="#FFFFFF"
| 
| 8.11 (59)
| 
| 14.19 (103)
| Windy Hill
| 14,310
| 29 August 1970
|- bgcolor="#FFFFFF"
| 
| 22.15 (147)
| 
| 7.9 (51)
| Victoria Park
| 41,451
| 29 August 1970
|- bgcolor="#FFFFFF"
| 
| 12.11 (83)
| 
| 6.6 (42)
| Arden Street Oval
| 6,435
| 29 August 1970
|- bgcolor="#FFFFFF"
| 
| 12.15 (87)
| 
| 14.17 (101)
| MCG
| 40,973
| 29 August 1970

Ladder

Consolation Night Series Competition
The consolation night series were held under the floodlights at Lake Oval, South Melbourne, for the teams (5th to 12th on ladder) out of the finals at the end of the home and away rounds.

Final:  13.17 (95) defeated Melbourne 13.15 (93).

Premiership Finals

First Semi-Final

Second Semi-Final

Preliminary Final

Grand final

Crowd figures

Awards
 The 1970 VFL Premiership team was Carlton.
 The VFL's leading goalkicker was Peter Hudson of Hawthorn who kicked 146 goals.
 The winner of the 1970 Brownlow Medal was Peter Bedford of South Melbourne with 25 votes.
 North Melbourne took the "wooden spoon" in 1970.
Melbourne 16.10 (106) defeated  16.8 (104) in the Grand Final, held as a curtain-raiser to the seniors Grand Final at the Melbourne Cricket Ground on 26 September.

Leading Goalkickers
Numbers highlighted in blue indicates the player led the goalkicking at the end of that round.
DNP = did not play in that round.

Notable events
 Unhappy with their treatment over the three seasons they spent at Princes Park, Fitzroy moved their home ground to the Junction Oval in St Kilda.
On Monday 9 March, the Victoria representative team played a match under Gaelic football rules against the 1969 All-Ireland Senior football champions, Kerry, at the Melbourne Cricket Ground. Kerry 4-11 defeated Victoria 2–10.
 Essendon's Don McKenzie, Geoff Gosper, Darryl Gerlach, Geoff Pryor, and Barry Davis, and Collingwood's Len Thompson and Des Tuddenham did not play in Round 1 due to separate disputes over player payments with their respective clubs (see Dispute over player payments).
 Essendon missed the finals in consecutive years, the first time this had occurred since 1939.
 The second half of the Round 1 match between Richmond and Fitzroy, played at the Melbourne Cricket Ground on Sunday, 5 April 1970, was attended by Queen Elizabeth II, Prince Philip, Duke of Edinburgh, the Prince of Wales (now Charles III) and Anne, Princess Royal, who were present as part of the 1970 royal tour commemorating the bicentenary of the first voyage of James Cook. The royals met the players on the field at half time and were present to unfurl Richmond's 1969 premiership flag before watching the second half. The match was specially scheduled to accommodate the royals' itinerary; it was the first VFL match played on a Sunday, and the second half was televised live in spite of the rules which normally precluded live telecasts of VFL matches.
 In Round 10, Collingwood trailed St Kilda by over ten goals late in the second quarter but came back to win by seven points. Their 52-point deficit remains, as of 2019, the greatest at half-time deficit by a winning side.
 The 1970 VFL season was the first in which three full-forwards (Alex Jesaulenko, Peter McKenna, and Peter Hudson) kicked at least 100 goals in a home-and-away season.
 South Melbourne ended the second-longest finals drought in league history (twenty-four seasons) by finishing fourth, making the finals for the first time since 1945.
 In Round 5, Ted Whitten played his 321st senior VFL game, breaking the record set by Dick Reynolds. Whitten retired after this match.
 On Monday 31 August HSV-7 broadcast the first live Brownlow Medal count.
 In the 1970 Second Semi-Final, Carlton's Syd Jackson was reported for striking Collingwood defender Lee Adamson. Carlton president George Harris, eager to have Jackson in his Grand Final team, devised the strategy of having the club's advocate to assert to the tribunal (on Jackson's behalf) that Jackson had been provoked by an extended series of racial taunts from Adamson, including repeatedly calling him "Sambo" and, furthermore, stating that Jackson would respond in the same way to any future vilification. The tribunal took the stance that the VFL had to be seen to protect its only top-level Aboriginal footballer at the time, and they immediately exonerated him, without hearing Adamson's side of the story, stating that Jackson had no case to answer. Jackson revealed much later that it had all been a set-up by George Harris. 
Collingwood had a great lead over Carlton during most of the game, however Carlton managed to come back and win the Grand Final by 10 points.

See also
 1970 VFL Grand Final

Footnotes

References
 Maplestone, M., Flying Higher: History of the Essendon Football Club 1872–1996, Essendon Football Club, (Melbourne), 1996. 
 Rogers, S. & Browne, A., Every Game Ever Played: VFL/AFL Results 1897–1997 (Sixth Edition), Viking Books, (Ringwood), 1998. 
 Ross, J. (ed), 100 Years of Australian Football 1897–1996: The Complete Story of the AFL, All the Big Stories, All the Great Pictures, All the Champions, Every AFL Season Reported, Viking, (Ringwood), 1996.

External links
 1970 Season – AFL Tables

Australian Football League seasons
Season